Agallia is a genus of leafhoppers in the family Cicadellidae. There are about 8 described species in Agallia. During courtship displays and mating, both males and females of the species A. constricta alternate in making ticking sounds.

Species 
 Agallia barretti
 Agallia brachyptera
 Agallia constricta Van Duzee, 1894 (constricted leafhopper)
 Agallia deleta
 Agallia lingula Van Duzee, 1907
 Agallia lingulata
 Agallia modesta Osborn & Ball, 1898
 Agallia peregrinans (Stal, 1859)
 Agallia quadripunctata (Provancher, 1872) (four-spotted clover leafhopper)

References

Further reading 

 
 

Cicadellidae genera
Megophthalminae